Online brand defense is a concept in consumer behavior. It refers to the situation where a consumer defends a brand against criticisms on online platforms. The reason why a consumer does this varies. It might be due to attachment to the brand. It could also be due to belief in the brand's high product quality leading to the perception that the criticisms are unjustified.

Since the early 21st century, the concept of online brand defense has drawn scholarly interests within the field of marketing, in particular consumer psychology. Many experts in this field have been discussing ways to induce online brand defense in one's customers, because such behavior is thought to help defend the brand against negative word-of-mouth.

See also 
Brand relationship
Quality management
Word-of-mouth marketing

References 

Brands
Consumer behaviour